The Calder River is a perennial river of the Corangamite catchment, located in the Otways region of the Australian state of Victoria.

Location and features
The Calder River rises in the Otway Ranges in southwest Victoria, near Bateman Ridge and flows generally south by west through the Port Campbell National Park towards the settlement of Horden Vale where the river enters Lake Costin and then Lake Craven, before reaching its confluence with the Aire River shortly before the Aire enters Bass Strait, northwest of Cape Otway. From its highest point, the Calder River descends  over its  course.

Etymology
The river was named by surveyor George Smythe after the River Calder in Yorkshire, England, similarly a tributary of the River Aire.

See also

 List of rivers of Victoria

References

External links

Corangamite catchment
Rivers of Barwon South West (region)
Otway Ranges